The 60th Golden Globe Awards, honoring the best in film and television for 2002, were held on January 19, 2003, in the Beverly Hilton Hotel, Beverly Hills, California. The nominations were announced on December 19, 2002.

Winners and nominees

These are the nominees for the 60th Golden Globe Awards. Winners are listed at the top of each list.

Film

The following films received multiple nominations:

The following films received multiple wins:

Television

The following programs received multiple nominations:

The following films and programs received multiple wins:

Ceremony

Presenters 

 Tim Allen
 Simon Baker
 Annette Bening
 Halle Berry
Beyoncé Knowles
 Cate Blanchett
 Bono
 Lara Flynn Boyle
 Carol Burnett
 Michael Caine
 Jennifer Connelly
 Kristin Davis
 Faye Dunaway
 Colin Farrell
 Calista Flockhart
 Harrison Ford
 Brendan Fraser
 Jennifer Garner
 Jeff Goldblum
 Kelsey Grammer
 Hugh Grant
 Salma Hayek
 Jill Hennessy
 Samuel L. Jackson
 Elton John
 Nicole Kidman
 Jude Law
 Heath Ledger
 Laura Linney
 Ray Liotta
 Sarah Jessica Parker
 Brad Pitt
 Sam Rockwell
 Arnold Schwarzenegger
 Sharon Stone
 Kiefer Sutherland
 Marisa Tomei
 Paul Walker
 Sigourney Weaver
 Robin Williams
Renée Zellweger

Cecil B. DeMille Award 
Gene Hackman

Mr. Golden Globe 
A.J. Lamas (son of Lorenzo Lamas & Michele Smith)

Miss Golden Globe 
Dominik Garcia (daughter of Andy Garcia & Marivi Lorido Garcia)

Awards breakdown 
The following networks received multiple nominations:

The following networks received multiple wins:

See also
 75th Academy Awards
 23rd Golden Raspberry Awards
 9th Screen Actors Guild Awards
 54th Primetime Emmy Awards
 55th Primetime Emmy Awards
 56th British Academy Film Awards
 57th Tony Awards
 2002 in film
 2002 in American television

References

060
2002 film awards
2002 television awards
2003 in California
January 2003 events in the United States
2002 awards in the United States